Schools named St. John's High School include:

Bahamas
 St John's College High School (Nassau, Bahamas); see Burton P. C. Hall

Canada
 St. John's High School (Winnipeg), North End, Winnipeg

India
 St. John's High School, Amalapuram
 St. John's High School, Bangalore
 St. John's High School, Chandigarh
 St. John's High School, Ranchi
 St. John's High School, Nagpur
 St. John's High School, Siddipet

United Kingdom
 St John's RC High School, Dundee, Scotland

United States
 St. Johns High School (Arizona) in St. Johns, Arizona
 St. John High School (Plaquemine, Louisiana)
 Saint John's High School (Massachusetts) in Shrewsbury
 St. Johns High School (Michigan) in St. Johns, Michigan
 St. John's High School (Delphos, Ohio)
 St. John's High School, the original name of Seton Catholic High School (Pittston, Pennsylvania)
 St. John's High School (South Carolina) in John's Island, Charleston County
 St. John's College High School in Washington, DC

Zimbabwe
 St. John's High School (Harare), Zimbabwe

See also
 St. John's College High School, Belize
 St. John's Jesuit High School and Academy in Toledo, Ohio
 St. John's Academy (disambiguation)
 Saint John's College (disambiguation)
 St. John's School (disambiguation)